Thomas Charles Hart (June 12, 1877July 4, 1971) was an admiral in the United States Navy, whose service extended from the Spanish–American War through World War II. Following his retirement from the navy, he served briefly as a United States Senator from Connecticut.

Life and career
Hart was born in Davison, Michigan. He attended the United States Naval Academy at Annapolis, graduating 13th in a class of 47 in 1897. Naval policy at the time required two years of sea duty following graduation from Annapolis before a naval cadet was commissioned an ensign.   Hart spent the next two years aboard the battleship . During the Spanish–American War,  Massachusetts became part of the American fleet blockading the Spanish squadron at Santiago de Cuba. Hart received a letter of commendation for his command of a steam cutter dispatched to reconnoiter Cabanas Bay for possible landing sites.  Under a withering fusillade of fire from Spanish shore batteries, Hart completed the mission and returned his craft to the ship without any casualties although the skiff was struck several times. Because of his ship handling skills, Hart was sent to augment the crew of a converted yacht, .  under Lt. Alexander Sharp Jr. and executive officer Ensign Arthur MacArthur III, older brother of Douglas MacArthur. The three quickly became lifelong friends.

Following the Spanish–American War, Hart spent two years on the sloop-of-war , after which he was posted to the Naval Academy, where he taught ordnance and gunnery for two years. While at Annapolis, he courted  Miss Caroline Brownson, daughter of Rear Admiral and Mrs. Willard H. Brownson, then superintendent of the Naval Academy and later commander of the Asiatic Fleet in 1906–07. Hart married Miss Brownson on March 30, 1910. At that time, LCDR Hart was assigned to inspect the building of the new   at the Fore River Shipyard in Quincy, Massachusetts, to which he was assigned prior to its commissioning on Monday, April 11, 1910. The Harts spent their honeymoon at the newly rebuilt luxury resort "The Homestead", in Hot Springs, Bath County, Virginia.

In 1917 he was Chief of Staff to the Commander, Submarine Force, Atlantic Fleet (COMSUBLANT), commanding COMSUBLANT's flagship  at New London, Connecticut. He also served in World War I as Director of Submarine Operations for the Navy Department. Serving in this office as its head until 1922, Hart fought doggedly to improve the lot of the submarine arm of the navy. His tenacity was responsible for the U.S. Navy's acquisition of surrendered German U-boats after World War I to learn the details of the technical innovations incorporated in the erstwhile enemy craft. Examination and trials of these U-boats were very influential in subsequent US Navy submarine design. He also was involved in the development of the Mark 6 torpedo exploder.

After World War I, Hart commanded . From 1931–34, Hart was Superintendent of the United States Naval Academy.

An unsuccessful recommendation of Hart's while on the General Board, beginning in 1936, was the building of small submarines. Hart's plan was to replace the aging S-boats, R-boats, and O-boats to provide area defense of submarine bases. During this period, Hart successfully advocated the building of large destroyer leaders, later classified as anti-aircraft light cruisers (CLAAs), which became the Atlanta class and others.

World War II

Hart was appointed commander in chief, U.S. Asiatic Fleet on July 25, 1939 and was promoted to admiral the same day.  He held that position at the commencement of hostilities in World War II between Japan and the United States in December 1941. The majority of forces under Hart's command were located in the Philippines, with a small force of destroyers and a light cruiser based in Borneo. His command included the majority of the combat-ready US submarines in the Pacific. Hart initially commanded U.S. naval forces from Manila, but was forced to relocate to Java on January 15, 1942, in light of rapid Japanese advances through the Philippine archipelago.  On his relocation to Java, Hart was named Commander, Naval Forces, ABDA Command, a joint British, Dutch, American and Australian military command, formed for purposes of holding the southern portions of the Dutch East Indies against further Japanese advances. While in command of ABDA naval forces, ships under his command fought the Battle of Balikpapan, a tactical victory, but strategic defeat for the allied forces.  Hart held the command of the U.S. Navy Asiatic Fleet until February 5, 1942, at which point the command ceased to exist as part of a broader U.S. military command restructuring in the Southwest Pacific.  Hart continued to hold the position of commander for ABDA naval forces until relieved of operational responsibilities on February 12, 1942. Hart formally was relieved of this title on February 16, 1942, when he left Java, ostensibly for health reasons, (and for political reasons as he was undermined by his British and Dutch subordinate Commanders). Returning to the US via Batavia to Ceylon on a British passenger vessel and then onto the United States.

Hart returned to the United States on March 8, 1942. President Roosevelt presented Hart with a Gold Star in lieu of a second Distinguished Service Medal in July 1942 (his first Distinguished Service Medal having been awarded for his service in World War I) for "[h]is conduct of the operations of the Allied naval forces in the Southwest Pacific area during January and February 1942, was characterized by unfailing judgment and sound decision, coupled with marked moral courage, in the face of discouraging surroundings and complex associations."  Hart was retired with the rank of admiral in July 1942, but recalled to duty in August 1942 as a member of the U.S. Navy's General Board.  Hart retired from active duty a second time in February 1945, on his appointment to the U.S. Senate to fill the seat of Francis T. Maloney, on Maloney's death.

Family and legacy
Hart's daughter Harriet Taft Hart was the wife of Francis B. Sayre, Jr., who was the son of President Woodrow Wilson's daughter Jessie Woodrow Wilson Sayre.

, commissioned in 1973, was named for Hart and was sponsored by Hart's granddaughter, Penny Hart Bragonier.

Upon his death on July 4, 1971, Hart was buried at Arlington National Cemetery.

Decorations
Here is the ribbon bar of Admiral Hart:

See also
 List of superintendents of the United States Naval Academy
 List of United States senators from Connecticut

References

 Friedman, Norman US Submarines through 1945: An Illustrated Design History, Annapolis, MD: Naval Institute Press, 1995, .
 Friedman, Norman US Cruisers: An Illustrated Design History, Annapolis, MD: Naval Institute Press, 1995, .
 Alden, John D., Commander, USN (retired). The Fleet Submarine in the U.S. Navy, Annapolis, MD: Naval Institute Press, 1979, .

Further reading

External links

 Biographical Directory of the United States Congress: Thomas Charles Hart
 ibiblio.org – Proceedings of the Hart Inquiry, on the Pearl Harbor Attack
 Proceedings of Pearl Harbor investigations including the Hart Inquiry
 

1877 births
1971 deaths
People from Davison, Michigan
Politicians from Brookline, Massachusetts
United States Navy personnel of World War I
United States Navy World War II admirals
Military personnel from Michigan
American military personnel of the Spanish–American War
United States Naval Academy alumni
United States Navy admirals
Connecticut Republicans
United States submarine commanders
Naval War College alumni
Superintendents of the United States Naval Academy
Republican Party United States senators from Connecticut
Burials at Arlington National Cemetery
Military personnel from Connecticut
Military personnel from Massachusetts